In neuroscience, synaptic plasticity is the ability of synapses to strengthen or weaken over time, in response to increases or decreases in their activity. Since memories are postulated to be represented by vastly interconnected neural circuits in the brain, synaptic plasticity is one of the important neurochemical foundations of learning and memory (see Hebbian theory).

Plastic change often results from the alteration of the number of neurotransmitter receptors located on a synapse. There are several underlying mechanisms that cooperate to achieve synaptic plasticity, including changes in the quantity of neurotransmitters released into a synapse and changes in how effectively cells respond to those neurotransmitters. Synaptic plasticity in both excitatory and inhibitory synapses has been found to be dependent upon postsynaptic calcium release.

Historical discoveries
In 1973, Terje Lømo and Tim Bliss first described the now widely studied phenomenon of long-term potentiation (LTP) in a publication in the Journal of Physiology. The experiment described was conducted on the synapse between the perforant path and dentate gyrus in the hippocampi of anaesthetised rabbits. They were able to show a burst of tetanic (100 Hz) stimulus on perforant path fibres led to a dramatic and long-lasting augmentation in the post-synaptic response of cells onto which these fibres synapse in the dentate gyrus. In the same year, the pair published very similar data recorded from awake rabbits. This discovery was of particular interest due to the proposed role of the hippocampus in certain forms of memory.

Biochemical mechanisms
Two molecular mechanisms for synaptic plasticity involve the NMDA and AMPA glutamate receptors. Opening of NMDA channels (which relates to the level of cellular depolarization) leads to a rise in post-synaptic Ca2+ concentration and this has been linked to long-term potentiation, LTP (as well as to protein kinase activation); strong depolarization of the post-synaptic cell completely displaces the magnesium ions that block NMDA ion channels and allows calcium ions to enter a cell – probably causing LTP, while weaker depolarization only partially displaces the Mg2+ ions, resulting in less Ca2+ entering the post-synaptic neuron and lower intracellular Ca2+ concentrations (which activate protein phosphatases and induce long-term depression, LTD).

These activated protein kinases serve to phosphorylate post-synaptic excitatory receptors (e.g. AMPA receptors), improving cation conduction, and thereby potentiating the synapse. Also, these signals recruit additional receptors into the post-synaptic membrane, stimulating the production of a modified receptor type, thereby facilitating an influx of calcium. This in turn increases post-synaptic excitation by a given pre-synaptic stimulus. This process can be reversed via the activity of protein phosphatases, which act to dephosphorylate these cation channels.

The second mechanism depends on a second messenger cascade regulating gene transcription and changes in the levels of key proteins at pommel synapses such as CaMKII and PKAII. Activation of the second messenger pathway leads to increased levels of CaMKII and PKAII within the dendritic spine. These protein kinases have been linked to growth in dendritic spine volume and LTP processes such as the addition of AMPA receptors to the plasma membrane and phosphorylation of ion channels for enhanced permeability. Localization or compartmentalization of activated proteins occurs in the presence of their given stimulus which creates local effects in the dendritic spine. Calcium influx from NMDA receptors is necessary for the activation of CaMKII. This activation is localized to spines with focal stimulation and is inactivated before spreading to adjacent spines or the shaft, indicating an important mechanism of LTP in that particular changes in protein activation can be localized or compartmentalized to enhance the responsivity of single dendritic spines. Individual dendritic spines are capable of forming unique responses to presynaptic cells. This second mechanism can be triggered by protein phosphorylation but takes longer and lasts longer, providing the mechanism for long-lasting memory storage. The duration of the LTP can be regulated by breakdown of these second messengers. Phosphodiesterase, for example, breaks down the secondary messenger cAMP, which has been implicated in increased AMPA receptor synthesis in the post-synaptic neuron .

Long-lasting changes in the efficacy of synaptic connections (long-term potentiation, or LTP) between two neurons can involve the making and breaking of synaptic contacts. Genes such as activin ß-A, which encodes a subunit of activin A, are up-regulated during early stage LTP. The activin molecule modulates the actin dynamics in dendritic spines through the MAP-kinase pathway. By changing the F-actin cytoskeletal structure of dendritic spines, spine necks are lengthened producing increased electrical isolation. The end result is long-term maintenance of LTP.

The number of ion channels on the post-synaptic membrane affects the strength of the synapse. Research suggests that the density of receptors on post-synaptic membranes changes, affecting the neuron's excitability in response to stimuli. In a dynamic process that is maintained in equilibrium, N-methyl D-aspartate receptor (NMDA receptor) and AMPA receptors are added to the membrane by exocytosis and removed by endocytosis. These processes, and by extension the number of receptors on the membrane, can be altered by synaptic activity. Experiments have shown that AMPA receptors are delivered to the synapse through vesicular membrane fusion with the postsynaptic membrane via the protein kinase CaMKII, which is activated by the influx of calcium through NMDA receptors. CaMKII also improves AMPA ionic conductance through phosphorylation.
When there is high-frequency NMDA receptor activation, there is an increase in the expression of a protein PSD-95 that increases synaptic capacity for AMPA receptors. This is what leads to a long-term increase in AMPA receptors and thus synaptic strength and plasticity.

If the strength of a synapse is only reinforced by stimulation or weakened by its lack, a positive feedback loop will develop, causing some cells never to fire and some to fire too much. But two regulatory forms of plasticity, called scaling and metaplasticity, also exist to provide negative feedback. Synaptic scaling is a primary mechanism by which a neuron is able to stabilize firing rates up or down.
  
Synaptic scaling serves to maintain the strengths of synapses relative to each other, lowering amplitudes of small excitatory postsynaptic potentials in response to continual excitation and raising them after prolonged blockage or inhibition. This effect occurs gradually over hours or days, by changing the numbers of NMDA receptors at the synapse (Pérez-Otaño and Ehlers, 2005). Metaplasticity varies the threshold level at which plasticity occurs, allowing integrated responses to synaptic activity spaced over time and preventing saturated states of LTP and LTD. Since LTP and LTD (long-term depression) rely on the influx of Ca2+ through NMDA channels, metaplasticity may be due to changes in NMDA receptors, altered calcium buffering, altered states of kinases or phosphatases and a priming of protein synthesis machinery. Synaptic scaling is a primary mechanism by which a neuron to be selective to its varying inputs.
The neuronal circuitry affected by LTP/LTD and modified by scaling and metaplasticity leads to reverberatory neural circuit development and regulation in a Hebbian manner which is manifested as memory, whereas the changes in neural circuitry, which begin at the level of the synapse, are an integral part in the ability of an organism to learn.

There is also a specificity element of biochemical interactions to create synaptic plasticity, namely the importance of location. Processes occur at microdomains – such as exocytosis of AMPA receptors is spatially regulated by the t-SNARE STX4. Specificity is also an important aspect of CAMKII signaling involving nanodomain calcium.
The spatial gradient of PKA between dendritic spines and shafts is also important for the strength and regulation of synaptic plasticity. It is important to remember that the biochemical mechanisms altering synaptic plasticity occur at the level of individual synapses of a neuron. Since the biochemical mechanisms are confined to these "microdomains," the resulting synaptic plasticity affects only the specific synapse at which it took place.

Theoretical mechanisms
A bidirectional model, describing both LTP and LTD, of synaptic plasticity has proved necessary for a number of different learning mechanisms in computational neuroscience, neural networks, and biophysics. Three major hypotheses for the molecular nature of this plasticity have been well-studied, and none are required to be the exclusive mechanism:
 Change in the probability of glutamate release.
 Insertion or removal of post-synaptic AMPA receptors.
 Phosphorylation and de-phosphorylation inducing a change in AMPA receptor conductance.

Of these, the latter two hypotheses have been recently mathematically examined to have identical calcium-dependent dynamics which provides strong theoretical evidence for a calcium-based model of plasticity, which in a linear model where the total number of receptors are conserved looks like

where

  is the synaptic weight of the th input axon,
  is the concentration of calcium,
  is also a function of the concentration of calcium that depends linearly on the number of receptors on the membrane of the neuron at some fixed point.

The model makes important simplifications that make it unsuited for actual experimental predictions, but provides a significant basis for the hypothesis of a calcium-based synaptic plasticity dependence.

Short-term plasticity
Short-term synaptic plasticity acts on a timescale of tens of milliseconds to a few minutes unlike long-term plasticity, which lasts from minutes to hours. Short term plasticity can either strengthen or weaken a synapse.

Synaptic enhancement
Short-term synaptic enhancement results from an increased probability of synaptic terminals releasing transmitters in response to pre-synaptic action potentials. Synapses will strengthen for a short time because of an increase in the amount of packaged transmitter released in response to each action potential. Depending on the time scales over which it acts synaptic enhancement is classified as neural facilitation, synaptic augmentation or post-tetanic potentiation.

Synaptic depression
Synaptic fatigue or depression is usually attributed to the depletion of the readily releasable vesicles. Depression can also arise from post-synaptic processes and from feedback activation of presynaptic receptors.
heterosynaptic depression is thought to be linked to the release of adenosine triphosphate (ATP) from astrocytes.

Long-term plasticity
Long-term depression (LTD) and long-term potentiation (LTP) are two forms of long-term plasticity, lasting minutes or more, that occur at excitatory synapses. NMDA-dependent LTD and LTP have been extensively researched, and are found to require the binding of glutamate, and glycine or D-serine for activation of NMDA receptors.
The turning point for the synaptic modification of a synapse has been found to be modifiable itself, depending on the history of the synapse. Recently, a number of attempts have been made to offer a comprehensive model that could account for most forms of synaptic plasticity.

Long-term depression
Brief activation of an excitatory pathway can produce what is known as long-term depression (LTD) of synaptic transmission in many areas of the brain. LTD is induced by a minimum level of postsynaptic depolarization and simultaneous increase in the intracellular calcium concentration at the postsynaptic neuron. LTD can be initiated at inactive synapses if the calcium concentration is raised to the minimum required level by heterosynaptic activation, or if the extracellular concentration is raised. These alternative conditions capable of causing LTD differ from the Hebb rule, and instead depend on synaptic activity modifications. D-serine release by astrocytes has been found to lead to a significant reduction of LTD in the hippocampus.
Activity-dependent LTD was investigated in 2011 for the electrical synapses (modification of Gap Junctions efficacy through their activity).. In the brain, cerebellum is one of the structures where LTD is a form of neuroplasticity.

Long-term potentiation
Long-term potentiation, commonly referred to as LTP, is an increase in synaptic response following potentiating pulses of electrical stimuli that sustains at a level above the baseline response for hours or longer. LTP involves interactions between postsynaptic neurons and the specific presynaptic inputs that form a synaptic association, and is specific to the stimulated pathway of synaptic transmission. 
The long-term stabilization of synaptic changes is determined by a parallel increase of pre- and postsynaptic structures such as axonal bouton, dendritic spine and postsynaptic density.
On the molecular level, an increase of the postsynaptic scaffolding proteins PSD-95 and Homer1c has been shown to correlate with the stabilization of synaptic enlargement.

Modification of astrocyte coverage at the synapses in the hippocampus has been found to result from the induction of LTP, which has been found to be linked to the release of D-serine, nitric oxide, and the chemokine, s100B by astrocytes.
LTP is also a model for studying the synaptic basis of Hebbian plasticity. Induction conditions resemble those described for the initiation of long-term depression (LTD), but a stronger depolarization and a greater increase of calcium are necessary to achieve LTP. Experiments performed by stimulating an array of individual dendritic spines, have shown that synaptic cooperativity by as few as two adjacent dendritic spines prevents LTD, allowing only LTP.

Synaptic strength
The modification of synaptic strength is referred to as functional plasticity. Changes in synaptic strength involve distinct mechanisms of particular types of glial cells, the most researched type being astrocytes.

Computational use of plasticity
Every kind of synaptic plasticity has different computational uses.
Short-term facilitation has been demonstrated to serve as both working memory and mapping input for readout, short-term depression for removing auto-correlation. Long-term potentiation is used for spatial memory storage while long-term depression for both encoding space features, selective weakening of synapses and clearing old memory traces respectively. Forward spike-timing-dependent plasticity is used for long range temporal correlation, temporal coding and spatiotemporal coding. The reversed spike-timing-dependent plasticity acts as sensory filtering.

See also 

 Homosynaptic plasticity
 Homeostatic plasticity
 Inhibitory postsynaptic potential
 Activity-dependent plasticity
 Neural backpropagation
 Neuroplasticity
 Postsynaptic potential
 Non-synaptic plasticity

References

Further reading

External links 
 Overview
 Finnerty lab, MRC Centre for Neurodegeneration Research, London
Brain Basics Synaptic Plasticity Synaptic transmission is plastic
 Synaptic Plasticity, Neuroscience Online (electronic neuroscience textbook by UT Houston Medical School)

Videos, podcasts 
 Synaptic plasticity: Multiple mechanisms and functions - a lecture by Robert Malenka, M.D., Ph.D., Stanford University. Video podcast, runtime: 01:05:17.

Memory
Neuroplasticity
Neurology
Neural synapse
Neural circuits

es:Neuroplasticidad